JoJuan Armour (born July 10, 1976) is a former safety in the National Football League and linebacker in the Canadian Football League. On February 25, 2010, Armour announced his retirement after six seasons in the CFL. He was a high school football defensive lineman coach for Whitmer High School in Toledo, Ohio and now with Urban Minority Alcoholism and Drug Abuse Outreach Program of Lucas County.

Early years
He is a 1995 graduate of Central Catholic High School (Toledo, Ohio) who was inducted into the school's athletic hall of fame in April 2006.

His early accomplishments include:

 Toledo City League player of the year in 1994 as a senior
 All-City first-team as both a running back and linebacker as a junior and senior
 All-Ohio second-team linebacker in Division I as a senior

College career
He played at Miami University.

 Two time Mid-American Conference defensive player of the year as a linebacker
 Finished his collegiate career ranked 10th all-time at Miami with 396 total tackles
 Made 67 tackles for 297 yards in losses, the second most in school history
 24.5 quarterback sacks, the third highest total in Miami history
 Garnered three All-MAC selections
 Third-team All-American as a senior
 Four year letterman with Miami

Professional career
He was drafted by the Oakland Raiders in 1999 and was later signed by the Cincinnati Bengals in December 1999. Armour started for the Bengals in 2001 and 2002 and was released by them in August 2003. In June 2004 Armour was signed as a free agent by the British Columbia Lions and played for them in 2004 and 2005. After the 2005 season Armour was signed by the Hamilton Tiger-Cats and played for them in the 2006 and 2007 seasons. In February 2008 he was signed by the Calgary Stampeders.  He helped Calgary win the 2008 Grey Cup. He was later released on June 22, 2009 for overaggressive plays during training camp. On August 3, 2009, the BC Lions re-signed Armour. On February 25, 2010, Armour announced his retirement after six seasons in the CFL, having spent three with the BC Lions.

References

1976 births
Living people
Sportspeople from Toledo, Ohio
American football safeties
Miami RedHawks football players
Oakland Raiders players
Jacksonville Jaguars players
Cincinnati Bengals players
Barcelona Dragons players
Canadian football linebackers
BC Lions players
Hamilton Tiger-Cats players
Calgary Stampeders players
Players of American football from Ohio